Mesopotamia Township is one of the twenty-four townships of Trumbull County, Ohio, United States. The 2000 census found 3,051 people in the township.

Geography
Located in the northwestern corner of the county, it borders the following townships:
Windsor Township, Ashtabula County - north
Orwell Township, Ashtabula County - northeast corner
Bloomfield Township - east
Bristol Township - southeast corner
Farmington Township - south
Parkman Township, Geauga County - southwest corner
Middlefield Township, Geauga County - west
Huntsburg Township, Geauga County - northwest corner

No municipalities are located in Mesopotamia Township.

Name and history
Named after the ancient region of Mesopotamia, it is the only Mesopotamia Township statewide.

Notable people
Leander F. Frisby, Wisconsin Attorney General, was born in the township.

Government
The township is governed by a three-member board of trustees, who are elected in November of odd-numbered years to a four-year term beginning on the following January 1. Two are elected in the year after the presidential election and one is elected in the year before it. There is also an elected township fiscal officer, who serves a four-year term beginning on April 1 of the year after the election, which is held in November of the year before the presidential election. Vacancies in the fiscal officership or on the board of trustees are filled by the remaining trustees.

References

External links
County website

Townships in Trumbull County, Ohio
Townships in Ohio